Richard Deodatus Poulett-Harris (26 October 1817 – 23 December 1899) was an educationalist in England and Tasmania.

Early life and education
Harris was born on Cape Breton Island, Nova Scotia, Canada, the eldest son of Captain Charles Poulett Harris of the 60th Rifles Regiment, who was stationed there. His mother was Anna Maria, daughter of Richard Stout, judge and member of the governor's council on Cape Breton Island. Harris was descended from Sir Amias Poulett, English ambassador to France in the reign of Queen Elizabeth I and afterwards keeper of Mary, Queen of Scots.

Harris was educated from 1837 at the Manchester Free Grammar School and from 1839 Trinity College, Cambridge where he graduated B.A. with honours in 1843, and M.A. in 1852.

Career 
He was ordained deacon in 1847 and priest in 1849 in the Church of England. He engaged in teaching and became second master at Sheffield Collegiate School in 1843, a master at Huddersfield College in 1844, and five years later was appointed classics master at Blackheath Proprietary School. In 1844 he married Catherine Prior Hall, with whom he had six children, including Georgiana Poulett Harris (Mrs. Ingle, 1845–1919), first headmistress of Christchurch Girls' High School in New Zealand.

Tasmania
After his wife's death in June 1856, Harris went to Tasmania to become headmaster of the Hobart high school, and filled the position with much ability, inspiring both respect and affection from his pupils. In 1858 he married Elizabeth Eleanor Milward, with whom he had another six children. It was at Harris' suggestion that an act was passed in 1858 founding a system of school examinations based on the Oxford and Cambridge local examinations, and also founding the Tasmanian scholarships of £200 a year tenable at English universities. He was one of the original members of the council of education founded in 1859, and long advocated the establishment of the University of Tasmania. He resigned from his headmastership in 1885 and lived in retirement near Hobart. When the university was founded in 1890 Harris was elected the first warden of the senate. He was also the first Grand Master of the Masonic Lodge in Tasmania.

Death and family
He died at Woodbridge, Tasmania, on 23 December 1899, and was survived by his wife, and of his first marriage: Georgiana; Katharine (1847–1940); Charlotte Maria (1850–1941); Annie Louisa (1853–1922), and Lovell Andrews (1856–1929); and of his second marriage: Eleanor Mary (1865–1931), Henry Vere (1866–1933), Anna May (1869–1953), and Louisa Violet (b. 1873). Louisa's younger twin, Harriet Lily, died from Tubercular Peritonitis in 1897, aged 23, having been a teacher at the Ladies' Grammar School and Kindergarten in Davey Street, Hobart that was run by her sisters. Richard and his daughters Eleanor and Lily are buried in the same grave at Cornelian Bay Cemetery.

See also
Henry Vere Poulett-Harris
Lily Poulett-Harris
Woodbridge, Tasmania

References

E. L. French, 'Harris, Richard Deodatus Poulett (1817–1899)', Australian Dictionary of Biography, Volume 4, MUP, 1972, pp 352–353. Retrieved 20 January 2009

 Rector and Grand Master: Being a Memoir of the Late Rev. Richard Deodatus Poulett-Harris Rector of The High School, Hobart and the First Grand Master of the Tasmanian Masons (Launceston, 1903)

1817 births
1899 deaths
English Anglicans
Schoolteachers from Greater Manchester
English emigrants to Australia
Freemasons of the United Grand Lodge of England
People from Cape Breton Island
Masonic Grand Masters
Australian schoolteachers
Burials in Tasmania